LBQS 1429-008 (QQ 1429−008, QQ 1432−0106, QQQ J1432−0106) is a physical triple quasar. It was the first physical triple discovered.

References 

Quasars
Virgo (constellation)